Hotel Boylston (1871-1894) of Boston, Massachusetts, stood at the corner of Tremont Street and Boylston Street in today's Boston Theater District. The architecture firm of Cummings and Sears designed it "in the Italian-Gothic style" as a residential apartment building. Among the tenants: New England Kennel Club; Christian Science Publishing Co.; and piano dealer Steinert & Sons and its 350-seat concert hall.

References

Further reading
 S. N. Carter. "Recent Architecture in Boston." The Art Journal (1875-1887), New Series, Vol. 3 (1877)
 American Architect and Building News, June 13, 1885

External links

 Bostonian Society. Photo of intersection of Tremont and Boylston Streets, c. 1890 (Hotel Boylston at right)
 Boston Public Library. Photo of Hotel Boylston

Boston Theater District
Hotel buildings completed in 1871
Former buildings and structures in Boston
1871 establishments in Massachusetts
1894 disestablishments in Massachusetts
19th century in Boston
Apartment buildings in Massachusetts